Kashif is the self-titled debut album by American singer Kashif. Produced by Kashif and Morrie Brown, it was released by Arista Records on September 14, 1983, in the United States, following his departure from the funk/disco group B. T. Express. The album reached number ten on the US Top R&B/Hip-Hop Albums chart and spawned the top five single "I Just Gotta Have You (Lover Turn Me On)." Kashif also includes the singles "Stone Love", "Help Yourself to My Love" and "Say Something Love". The album was digitally remastered by Funky Town Grooves in 2012 and includes five additional tracks.

Critical reception

AllMusic editor Craig Lytle found that "this album has one good composition after another. Kashif's adamant deliveries are poisely contrasted by cooing background. Though there are no authentic string and horn ensemble, the former B.T. Express member gets optimal use of his synthesizers and keyboards. This is an excellent debut." Robert Christgau gave the album a C+ rating and wrote in his "Consumer Guide" column in The Village Voice: "As if he were Dick Griffey or somebody, admirers cite the radio appeal of this Brooklyn pheenom's smooth concoctions and recall the heroic deeds of Berry Gordy. Whether that rings true with you depends on whether you value the radio of the '80s as much as that of the '60s."

Track listing 
All tracks produced by Kashif and Morrie Brown.

Personnel 
 Kashif – arrangements, lead vocals (1-5), all other instruments (1, 4, 5, 6), acoustic piano (2, 6), Fender Rhodes (2, 3, 4, 6, 8), Oberheim OB-Xa (2, 3, 6, 8), backing vocals (2, 3, 4, 6), Moog bass (3), drums (3, 4, 6), percussion (3, 4), Moog synthesizer (4, 8), all instruments (7), finger snaps (7), voice (7), all vocals (8)
 Ralph Schuckett – keyboards (2, 8), arrangements (8)
 Paul Laurence – Fender Rhodes (4)
 Ira Siegel – guitars (1-6, 8)
 Ronny Drayton – guitars (3)
 Wayne Braithwaite – bass (2, 8)
 Leslie Ming – drums (1, 2, 3, 5, 8)
 Trevor Gale – drums (8)
 Andy Newmark – drums (8)
 Bashiri Johnson – percussion (1, 2, 5, 8)
 Robin Dunn – finger snaps (7)
 Kevin Harewood – finger snaps (7)
 Freda Payne – finger snaps (7)
 Kenny G – saxophone solo (6)
 B.J. Nelson – backing vocals (1, 2, 4, 5), additional backing vocals (3)
 Lillo Thomas – backing vocals (1-5)
 Evelyn "Champagne" King – backing vocals (2, 3)
 Brenda White – backing vocals (2, 4)
 Michelle Cobbs – additional backing vocals (3), backing vocals (6)
 Fonzi Thornton – additional backing vocals (3), backing vocals (4)
 Tawatha Agee – backing vocals (4)
 Philip Ballou – backing vocals (4)
 La La – lead vocals (4)
 Latifa – backing vocals (6)

Production 
 Kashif – producer, front cover stylist 
 Morrie Brown – producer 
 Steve Goldman – chief engineer
 Larry Alexander – additional engineer
 Chuck Ange – additional engineer 
 Michael Barbiero – additional engineer 
 Larry DeCarmine – assistant engineer 
 Dennis O'Donnell – assistant engineer 
 Don Peterkofsky – additional assistant engineer 
 John Wright – additional assistant engineer 
 Herb Powers Jr. – mastering at Frankford/Wayne Mastering Labs (New York, NY)
 Kate Jansen – production administrator
 Dana Lester – production administrator
 Donn Davenport – art direction 
 Sam Gibson – front cover photography 
 Rotem – back cover photography 
 Latifa – front cover stylist 
 Debbie Engelsmsn – back cover stylist
 Michael Robinson – hair stylist
 Fran Cooper – make-up
 Hush Productions and The New Music Group, Inc. – management

Charts

References

External links
 
 Kashif (1983) at Discogs

1983 debut albums
Kashif (musician) albums
Boogie albums